Espen Stokkeland (born 4 July 1968) is a Norwegian sailor and Olympic medalist. He received a bronze medal in the Soling Class at the 2000 Summer Olympics in Sydney, together with Paul Davis and Herman Horn Johannessen.

Stokkeland resides at Fornebu.

References

External links
 
 
 

1968 births
Living people
Norwegian male sailors (sport)
Olympic sailors of Norway
Olympic bronze medalists for Norway
Olympic medalists in sailing
Sailors at the 1996 Summer Olympics – Soling
Sailors at the 2000 Summer Olympics – Soling
Medalists at the 2000 Summer Olympics
World champions in sailing for Norway
5.5 Metre class sailors
World Champions in 5.5 Metre